Astemir Aleksandrovich Gordyushenko (born 30 March 1997) is a Russian football player who plays as a central midfielder for Rodina Moscow.

Career

Club
Gordyushenko made his debut for the main squad of PFC CSKA Moscow in the Russian Cup game against FC Yenisey Krasnoyarsk on 21 September 2016, with his Russian Premier League debut for CSKA Moscow coming on 2 October 2016 against FC Rostov.

On 21 November 2016, Gordyushenko extended his contract with CSKA Moscow until the end of the 2019–20 season.

On 25 January 2019, he joined Tyumen on loan until the end of the 2018–19 season.

On 13 February 2020, CSKA Moscow confirmed that Gordyushenko had left the club to join Torpedo Moscow.

Career statistics

Club

References

External links
 
 Profile by Football National League

1997 births
Sportspeople from Nalchik
Living people
Russian footballers
Association football midfielders
Russia youth international footballers
PFC CSKA Moscow players
FC Tyumen players
FC Torpedo Moscow players
FC Tom Tomsk players
Russian Premier League players
Russian First League players